José Julio Espinoza Valeriani (born 23 June 1974) is a Peruvian football manager and former player who played as a midfielder. He is the current manager of Universidad San Martín.

Espinoza also holds an Italian passport.

Club career
Born in Lima, Espinoza played once for Scottish side Dundee United in August 1998, returning to Peru to sign for Sporting Cristal. From here, he played for a number of Peruvian sides, including Universitario de Deportes, Estudiantes de Medicina and FBC Melgar.

After retiring, Espinoza worked in the youth categories of Universidad San Martín. On 15 March 2021, after the departure of Héctor Bidoglio, he was named first team manager.

References

External links

1974 births
Living people
Footballers from Lima
Association football midfielders
Peruvian footballers
Club Universitario de Deportes footballers
Dundee United F.C. players
Sporting Cristal footballers
Estudiantes de Medicina footballers
FBC Melgar footballers
Scottish Premier League players
Peruvian expatriate footballers
Expatriate footballers in Scotland
Peruvian football managers
Peruvian Primera División managers
Universidad San Martín managers